Lloyd Llewellyn (sometimes abbreviated LLLL) is a comic book by Daniel Clowes. The black-and-white series, published by Fantagraphics Books, ran for six issues from April 1986 to June 1987. A final "special" issue was published in December 1988.

Daniel Clowes published other Lloyd Llewellyn stories in other books by Fantagraphics.
- In Love and Rockets #13 which contains the Story "The Last Time  I sqaw Irving" and a special preview page (Last Quarter 1985)
- in Doosmday Squad #2 (reprinting Charlton's Doomsday+1 #2 by Joe Gil and John Byrne) we find the Story "Under the Big Top" (Early 1986)

The series' title character is a detective who has humorous adventures inspired by film noir and stereotypical 1950s lounge culture. Llewellyn has a sidekick who goes by the name of Ernie Hoyle. The series' police sergeant is called "Red" Hoerring. The series' visual style is influenced by lowbrow art.

The story "The Nightmare" from Lloyd Llewellyn #6 foreshadowed the approach of Clowes's next comic, Eightball, by breaking the conventions of the series' crime setting and turning to social satire. Also in that issue, the author announces:

... And who knows ... somewhere along that lonesome road we might see a new LLLL mag with a brand new format so dazzling, so breathtaking, so monumentally fantastic that I haven't even thought of it yet!

Early issues of Eightball included several additional Lloyd Llewellyn episodes. The character also made various cameo appearances in other Eightball stories.

Book collections
 #$@&!: The Official Lloyd Llewellyn Collection (Fantagraphics, 1993; out of print) 
 The Manly World of Lloyd Llewellyn (Fantagraphics, 1994; out of print)

External links
 Daniel Clowes at Fantagraphics Books' website

1986 comics debuts
1987 comics endings
Llewellyn, Lloyd
Comics by Daniel Clowes
Comics characters introduced in 1986
Detective comics
Fantagraphics titles
Llewellyn, Lloyd
Humor comics
Llewelly, Lloyd